Levine Music is a non-profit community music center serving the Greater Washington DC metropolitan area.  Levine currently operates four campuses, in Northwest DC, Southeast DC, Strathmore MD, and Arlington VA.  Levine welcomes students of all ages and abilities, from all economic backgrounds.

History

Levine was founded in 1976 by Ruth Cogen, Diana Engel and Jackie Marlin.  They named the school after their dear friend, DC attorney and amateur pianist Selma M. Levine, who had died.  During its first year, Levine operated in rented rooms in a DC church, where 16 faculty members taught 70 students.  A $10,000 grant from the Eugene and Agnes E. Meyer Foundation enabled the school to offer scholarships to 8 students.

In the years since then, Levine has grown into "one of the country's leading community music schools."  It has expanded to four campuses, 3,700 students, and 150 faculty members.  This year, Levine will provide free or subsidized instruction to more than 850 at-risk youth and children, at a cost to the school of $800,000.

Levine initially opened its campus in Southeast D.C. in 1992, at the Village of Parklands Shopping Center in Anacostia, becoming the first major arts non-profit to serve the Southeast section of the city.  In 2005, Levine moved the Southeast Campus to the Town Hall Education Arts and Recreation Campus (THEARC). THEARC also houses branches of a number of other organizations also committed to serving disadvantaged and at-risk children: the Children’s Hospital Wellness Clinic, the Boys & Girls Clubs of Greater Washington, Covenant House, The Washington Ballet, Corcoran School of Art and Design, Parklands Community Center, Trinity Washington University, and the Washington Middle School for Girls. Levine's program at THEARC serves 200 children, 90% of whom require scholarship support.

Today
Levine is one of only 16 community music schools accredited by the National Association of Schools of Music, and the only all-Steinway community music center in the world.  As well, Levine is certified by the National Guild of Community Schools of the Arts as "exemplifying the highest standards of excellence and access in community arts education."

Levine offers music instruction to all interested students in the Greater Washington area, regardless of age, ability, or financial circumstances.  Its students range in age from infants to seniors citizens.  The school offers everything from Early Childhood music experiences, to ensembles for high-school-aged students, to choirs for senior citizens.

Areas of study
Chamber Music
Dalcroze Studies
Early Childhood & Elementary Music
Guitar
Jazz
Music Theory & Composition
Percussion
Piano
Performing Arts & Musical Theatre
Recording Arts
Strings
Summer Programs
Suzuki Method<
Voice
Winds & Brass

Partner organizations
Town Hall Education, Arts and Recreation Campus, THEARC 
The Music Center at Strathmore (Maryland)
The Silver Spring Library

News
Northern Virginia Magazine: Favorites for Kids 
NASA and the Levine School Combine Space and Music

Professors
Natalie Draper - Composition
Duane A. Moody - Voice
Ralitza Patcheva - Piano
Jose Santana - Piano
Michael Volchok - Piano

Carlos César Rodríguez - Piano

Alumni

 Alyson Cambridge (born 1980), operatic soprano and classical music, jazz, and American popular song singer

Notes

External links

Music Matters, Levine School of Music's quarterly e-newsletter
Strathmore Homepage
THEARC Homepage

Educational institutions established in 1976
Forest Hills (Washington, D.C.)
Music schools in Washington, D.C.
Music schools in Maryland
Music schools in Virginia
1976 establishments in Washington, D.C.